Ren Hang may refer to:

 Ren Hang (photographer) (1987–2017), Chinese photographer
 Ren Hang (footballer) (born 1989), Chinese association football player